Luís  Carrilho is the United Nations Police Adviser since November 2017.

Career 
Prior to this, Patrick Low held this role but is now promoted to commissioner of the UNPOL.  He served previously as United Nations Police Commissioner in the Central African Republic (MINUSCA), in Haiti (MINUSTAH) and in Timor-Leste (UNMIT).

In 2014, Carrilho briefed the United Nations Security Council on the role of policing in peacekeeping. Carrilho advocated for more women in police and at the 2016 United Nations Chiefs of Police Summit that more "police keeping" is needed in UN peacekeeping operations.

Other activities 
 Center for International Peace Operations (ZIF), Member of the International Advisory Board

Recognition 
On 29 March 2012, Carrilho received a medal of merit for efforts to consolidate peace and security from the President of Timor-Leste, José Ramos Horta.

References

Portuguese officials of the United Nations
Portuguese police officers